"Hot in the City" is a song by Billy Idol, released as the lead single from his 1982 self-titled album. It charted at No. 23 in the US  and No. 58 in the UK. A remix of the song was released in 1987 and reached No. 13 in the UK.

Track listings
(1982) UK 7" vinyl single
"Hot in the City"
"Dead on Arrival"
(1982) UK 12" vinyl single
"Hot in the City" (Extended Version)
"Dead on Arrival"

1987 release
The Exterminator Mix of the song was released as a single in the UK on 29 December 1987. It charted higher in the UK this time round, peaking at No. 13 in early 1988. This version was first released in 1985 on the remix album Vital Idol.

Track listings
(1987) UK 7" vinyl single
"Hot in the City (Exterminator Fix)"
"Catch My Fall" (Remix Fix)
(1987) UK 12" vinyl single
"Hot in the City" (Exterminator Mix)
"Catch My Fall" (Remix Fix)
"Soul Standing By"

Music video
There are two versions of the video. The first version (the 1982 version) starts off with a girl walking into a record store. She picks up a Billy Idol record and the song starts to play. The video features scenes from New York City, interspersed with stock footage of nuclear bomb tests. The second version (the 1987 version) depicted Idol's girlfriend Perri Lister bound to a cross; it was banned by MTV. The later version was included on the DVD edition of The Very Best of Billy Idol: Idolize Yourself.

Other versions and covers
Although the released version of the song has Idol shouting "New York!", other versions of the song were recorded for various radio stations, including ones for such cities as  "Amarillo", "Boston", "Minneapolis", "New Haven", "Chattanooga", and "Sioux Falls", or none at all with a repeated synthesiser stab instead.

Appearances in other media
The song, with a remixed synthesizer intro, was used as the introduction  for Booker, the TV series spin-off of 21 Jump Street. It is also featured in the 1988 hit film, Big, starring Tom Hanks.

The song was used by the NBA's Phoenix Suns during the introductions of the visiting team at home games during the team's run to the 1993 NBA Finals.

Chart performance

Weekly charts

1Re-released in 1987

Year-end charts

References

External links
 

1982 songs
1982 singles
1987 singles
Billy Idol songs
Songs written by Billy Idol
Song recordings produced by Keith Forsey
Chrysalis Records singles